NGC 5500 is an elliptical galaxy in the constellation of Boötes, registered in New General Catalogue (NGC).

Observation history
NGC 5500 was discovered by William Herschel on 12 May 1787. John Louis Emil Dreyer inside the New General Catalogue, described the galaxy as "considerably faint, considerably small, irregularly round"

Notes

References

Galaxies discovered in 1787
5500
Astronomical objects discovered in 1787
Elliptical galaxies
NGC 5500
Discoveries by William Herschel